Debreceni Vízilabda Sport Egyesület is a Hungarian water polo club from Debrecen, that plays in the OB I, the top-level league of water polo in Hungary. Founded in 2006, the team first entered the domestic competition system in 2007, playing in the third division. They won promotion to the second-tier championship in 2010, but, after received an invitation from the Hungarian Waterpolo Federation to join the expanding OB I, Debrecen jumped another level and began the 2010–11 season in the top division.

Naming history
 Debreceni Cívis Póló Vízilabda SE: (2006/07 – 2009/10)
 Debrecen Fujitsu: (2010/11)
 Debreceni VSE: (2011/12 – 2020/21)
 DVSE-Master Good: (2021/22)

Honours

European competitions 
LEN Euro Cup
Semi-finalist (1): 2012–13

Current squad
Season 2016–2017

Staff

Transfers 

 In:
 Tamás Somlai (from Miskolci VLC)
 Péter Tóth (from Pécsi VSK)
 Tommaso Busilacchi (from Sport Management)
 Lukáš Ďurík (from Barcelona)

 Out:
 Gergely Pataki (to Kaposvár)
 Árpád Babay (to Vasas)
 Márton Halek (to Miskolci VLC)
 Attila Kincses (to Miskolci VLC)
 Gergely Hoppál (to Tatabányai Vízmű)

Recent seasons

 Promoted to OB I due MVLSZ decision.
 Cancelled due to the COVID-19 pandemic in Hungary.

In European competition
Participations in Euro Cup: 1x

Notable former players

Olympic champions
Tamás Varga – 4 years (2011-2015)  2004 Athens, 2008 Beijing
 Branislav Mitrović – 3 years (2011-2014)  2016 Rio de Janeiro

Former coaches

 András Gyöngyösi (2009–2013)
 Tamás Varga (2013–2016)
 Péter Komlósi (2017– present)

References

External links
 

Water polo clubs in Hungary
Sports clubs established in 2006
Sports clubs in Debrecen